Sperlyng is a surname. Notable people with the surname include:
 Nicholas Sperlyng (fl. 1388–1402), English politician

See also 
 Sperling

Surnames from nicknames